Twenty pence may refer to:

A Twenty pence (British coin), a decimal subdivision of the pound sterling
A Twenty pence (Irish coin), a decimal subdivision of the now withdrawn Irish pound.
A Gold penny, an English medieval gold coin from the 13th century